Bradley James Banda (born 20 January 1998) is a Gibraltarian semi-professional association football player, who currently plays as a goalkeeper for Europa and the Gibraltar national football team.

International career
Banda earned his first senior call-up to the Gibraltar national football team in March 2018, while playing for Team Solent. On 11 October 2021, he made his international debut in a 6–0 defeat against the Netherlands, saving a penalty from Memphis Depay. He kept his first senior international clean sheet in his second game, a 0-0 draw against Grenada on 23 March 2022.

Career statistics

International

Personal life
Outside of football, Banda works as a special needs teaching assistant at St Martin's School in Gibraltar.

References

1998 births
Living people
Gibraltarian footballers
Gibraltar international footballers
Association football goalkeepers
Lions Gibraltar F.C. players
Manchester 62 F.C. players
Lincoln Red Imps F.C. players
Alumni of Solent University
Glacis United F.C. players
Lynx F.C. players
Europa F.C. players
Gibraltar Premier Division players
Wessex Football League players